Kai Yip is one of the 37 constituencies in the Kwun Tong District of Hong Kong which was created in 1994 and currently held by Au Yeung Kwan-nok of the Democratic Alliance for the Betterment and Progress of Hong Kong.

The constituency loosely covers Kai Yip Estate and Kai Tai Court in Kowloon Bay with the estimated population of 20,355.

Councillors represented

Election results

2010s

2000s

1990s

References

Constituencies of Hong Kong
Constituencies of Kwun Tong District Council
1994 establishments in Hong Kong
Constituencies established in 1994
Kowloon Bay